Dembo Darboe (born 17 August 1998) is a Gambian professional footballer who plays as a forward for Kazakhstan Premier League club Astana, on loan from UAE Pro League club Al-Nasr, and the Gambia national team.

Club career

Early years
Darboe started his professional football career at the age of 17 with Real de Banjul, where he only played for one season. In the summer of 2017, he made his first move to Senegalese club ASEC Ndiambour, where he spent two seasons.

In 2019, Darboe moved to Europe where he signed for North Macedonian club Shkupi. In his second season at the club, he experienced his breakthrough by scoring 17 goals in 19 league appearances.

Shakhtyor Soligorsk
In January 2021, Darboe signed with defending Belarusian champions, Shakhtyor Soligorsk, for an undisclosed fee believed to be €700,000. He made his debut for the club in the starting lineup of the Belarusian Super Cup win over BATE Borisov on 2 March 2021.

Al-Nasr
In August 2022, Darboe joined UAE Pro League club Al-Nasr.

Darboe joined Kazakhstan Premier League club Astana on a one-year loan deal on 25 January 2023.

International career
Darboe debuted for the Gambia in a 2–0 friendly win over Niger on 6 June 2021.

He played in the 2021 Africa Cup of Nations, his national team's first continental tournament, where they made a sensational quarter-final.

Honours
Shakhtyor Soligorsk
 Belarusian Premier League: 2021
 Belarusian Super Cup: 2021

References

External links 
 
 

1998 births
Living people
People from Brikama
Gambian footballers
The Gambia international footballers
Association football midfielders
Real de Banjul FC players
ASEC Ndiambour players
FK Shkupi players
FC Shakhtyor Soligorsk players
Al-Nasr SC (Dubai) players
FC Astana players
Senegal Premier League players
Macedonian First Football League players
Belarusian Premier League players
UAE Pro League players
2021 Africa Cup of Nations players
Gambian expatriate footballers
Expatriate footballers in Senegal
Expatriate footballers in North Macedonia
Expatriate footballers in Belarus
Expatriate footballers in the United Arab Emirates
Expatriate footballers in Kazakhstan
Gambian expatriate sportspeople in Senegal
Gambian expatriate sportspeople in North Macedonia
Gambian expatriate sportspeople in Belarus
Gambian expatriate sportspeople in Kazakhstan